The 58th Texas Legislature met from January 8, 1963, to May 24, 1963. All members present during this session were elected in the 1962 general elections.

Sessions

Regular Session: January 8, 1963 - May 24, 1963

Party summary

Senate

House

Officers

Senate
 Lieutenant Governor: Preston Smith (D)
 President Pro Tempore: Martin Dies, Jr. (D)

House
 Speaker of the House: Byron Tunnell (D)

Members

Senate

Dist. 1
 A.M. Aikin, Jr. (D), Paris

Dist. 2
 Jack Strong (D), Longview

Dist. 3
 Martin Dies, Jr. (D), Lufkin

Dist. 4
 D. Roy Harrington (D), Port Arthur

Dist. 5
 Neveille Colson (D), Navasota

Dist. 6
 Criss Cole (D), Houston

Dist. 7
 Galloway Calhoun (D), Tyler

Dist. 8
 George Parkhouse (D), Dallas

Dist. 9
 Ralph Hall (D), Rockwall

Dist. 10
 Don Kennard (D), Fort Worth

Dist. 11
 William T. "Bill" Moore (D), Bryan

Dist. 12
 J.P. Word (D), Meridian

Dist. 13
 Murray Watson, Jr. (D), Waco

Dist. 14
 Charles F. Herring (D), Austin

Dist. 15
 Culp Krueger (D), El Campo

Dist. 16
 Louis Crump (D), San Saba

Dist. 17
 A.R. "Babe" Schwartz (D), Galveston

Dist. 18
 W.N. "Bill" Patman (D), Ganado

Dist. 19
 Walter Richter (D), Gonzales

Dist. 20
 Bruce Reagan (D), Corpus Christi

Dist. 21
 Abraham Kazen (D), Laredo

Dist. 22
 Tom Creighton (D), Mineral Wells

Dist. 23
 George Moffett (D), Chillicothe

Dist. 24
 David Ratliff (D), Stamford

Dist. 25
 Dorsey B. Hardeman (D), San Angelo

Dist. 26
 Franklin Spears (D), San Antonio

Dist. 27
 James Bates (D), Edinburg

Dist. 28
 H.J. "Doc" Blanchard (D), Lubbock

Dist. 29
 Frank Owen (D), Midland

Dist. 30
 Andrew J. Rogers (D), Childress

Dist. 31
 Grady Hazlewood (D), Amarillo

House

References

External links

58th Texas Legislature
1963 in Texas
1963 U.S. legislative sessions